The 1996 North Queensland Cowboys season was the 2nd in the club's history. Coached by Graham Lowe and captained by Adrian Vowles, they competed in the Optus Cup.

Season summary
After finishing their debut season in last place, there was nowhere to go but up for the Cowboys in 1996. Under new head coach, former New Zealand, Queensland, Manly and Wigan boss Graham Lowe, the club recruited fairly strongly bringing in first grade regulars Jason Death (from Canberra) and Andrew Dunemann (from Gold Coast), former All Black Shane Howarth and New Zealand representatives Se'e Solomona and Whetu Taewa. Dunemann's signing would see him reunite with his brother Ian, the pair becoming the first siblings to play for the club.

Due to the ongoing Super League war, the clubs affiliated with the breakaway competition refused to participate in their Round 1 games, with the Cowboys' opening fixture, against fellow Super League-aligned club the Canterbury Bulldogs, cancelled. After losing their first game of the year against the Sydney City Roosters, the Cowboys picked up their first win of the season a week later against the Sydney Tigers. Seven straight losses followed until a Round 11 victory over the Newcastle Knights was followed by a win over the Cronulla Sharks, the club's first ever back-to-back wins. After four straight losses, the Cowboys ended the season in their strongest form to date, with three wins from their final six games. That included a win over the St George Dragons at Kogarah Oval in Round 21, the club's first win in Sydney. The club would end their second season in 17th place, with six wins from 21 games, tripling their win total from the year before. Steve Edmed, a long time Balmain Tiger who joined the Cowboys for the 1996 season, was named Player of the Year after playing in all 21 games in his lone season with the club.

The club made headlines during the season when Moranbah junior Josh Hannay was named to make his first grade debut at just 16-years old. The selection was later vetoed by the Australian Rugby League as Hannay was not 16 when the year began. Had he played, he would have been the second youngest player to make his senior debut in Australian rugby league history. Hannay would make his debut two years later and go onto play 150 games for the club over nine seasons.

Milestones
 Round 2: Jason Death, Steve Edmed, Martin Locke, Whetu Taewa and Kris Tassell made their debuts for the club.
 Round 2: Shane Howarth made his first grade debut.
 Round 3: Willie Poching made his debut for the club.
 Round 3: Scott Brown made his debut for the club.
 Round 6: Se'e Solomona made his debut for the club.
 Round 7: Andrew Dunemann made his debut for the club.
 Round 9: Andrew Bulmer made his first grade debut.
 Round 11: Michael Coorey made his first grade debut.
 Round 12: The club won back-to-back games for the first time.
 Round 13: John Buttigieg made his first grade debut.
 Round 15: Marshall Miller and Graham White made their first grade debuts.
 Round 17: Liam Johnson made his first grade debut.

Squad list

Squad movement

1996 Gains

1996 Losses

Ladder

Fixtures

Regular season

Statistics

Source:

Honours

Club
Player of the Year: Steve Edmed
Players' Player: Steve Edmed
Club Person of the Year: Martin Locke

References

North Queensland Cowboys seasons
North Queensland Cowboys